Apiwat is a Thai given name. Notable people with the name include:

 Apiwat Chaemcharoen (born 1991), futsal player
 Apiwat Ngaolamhin (born 1986), footballer
 Apiwat Pengprakon (born 1988), footballer
 Apiwat Saisoi (born 1983), footballer
 Apiwat Ueathavornsuk (born 1982), singer-songwriter
 Apiwat Wongthananon (born 1994), motorcycle racer